Halifax Health is a system of hospitals and professional centers in Volusia and Flagler counties in the U.S. state of Florida. It was established in 1928.

Medicare Fraud 
US Department of Justice and the Office of Inspector General, U.S. Department of Health and Human Services sued the Halifax system for alleged violations of the Stark Law. The government claimed that Halifax's  bonus structure deliberately improperly incentivized medical oncologists to refer Medicare patients to the hospital, and paid oncologists above-market rates. The case was initiated by a whistleblower, Elin Baklid-Kunz, who filed a complaint under the qui tam provisions of the False Claims Act. After the District Court for the Middle District of Florida ruled in favor of the government in November 2013, Halifax agreed to settle the claims with a payment of $85 Million in March 2014.

References

External links
 

Medical and health organizations based in Florida
Companies based in Volusia County, Florida
Flagler County, Florida
American companies established in 1928
1928 establishments in Florida
Medicare fraud
Health fraud